Ahmedabad International School (AIS) is a private school located in Ahmedabad, Gujarat, India.

It is one of the SAT and ACT centers in the state of Gujarat, other being Navrachana International School in Vadodara. The school also administers Advanced Placement Program (AP) exams. 

The head of the school is Dr. Anjali Sharma. There has been only one previous head.

In 2017 the District Primary Education Officer (DPEO) imposed a fine of 110,000 rupees and required a change in the curriculum from the upcoming school year, upon finding that the school was not using textbooks approved by the Gujarat Secondary and Higher Secondary Education Board. The school soon transitioned to using NCERT textbooks.

Academics and curriculum
Ahmedabad International School has been authorized to offer the Cambridge International Examinations (CIE), International Baccalaureate Organisation (IBO) and Gujarat Secondary and Higher Secondary Education Board (GSHSEB). Children from Grade 1 through 5 are offered the IBO's Primary Years Program (PYP). Students in Grades 6 and 7 are offered CIE's International General Certificate of Secondary Education (IGCSE). Students from Grades 8 to 10 are given a choice between the IGCSE program or GSEB. Pupils in Grades 11 and 12 are offered three choices: the CIE's A Levels, IBO's IBDP, or GHSEB.

Uniform 
Girls are required to wear the school shirt, which is white with thin grey stripes running vertically across it, and a grey skirt. Boys wear the same school shirt and grey trousers. All students are required to wear the school tie every day except Friday, when they are supposed to wear their house-shirt(Aqua-Blue, Terra-green, Ignis-red and Ventus-yellow). Plain, black shoes are required every day. There are no regulations on the type of stationery, backpacks, etc.

See also
 International Baccalaureate
 Cambridge International Examinations
 Gujarat Secondary and Higher Secondary Education Board
 NCERT textbook controversies

References

External links
 Official website
 Ahmedabad International School on International Baccalaureate

Schools in Ahmedabad
Cambridge schools in India
International Baccalaureate schools in India
Private schools in Gujarat
Educational institutions established in 2000
2000 establishments in India